Alfred Dwight Foster Hamlin, A.M., L.H.D. (September 18, 1855 – March 21, 1926) was an American architect, born at Istanbul, Turkey as the son of missionary Cyrus Hamlin.  He graduated at Amherst in 1875, studied architecture at Boston and Paris, and afterward began teaching architecture at Columbia in its School of Engineering.  He was director from 1903 to 1912.  While he was the director, he commented on the Treaty of Lausanne by saying, "Treaty was worthless and the Turks untrustworthy".

He wrote many articles in the professional magazines was the author of A textbook of the History of Architecture (1906).  He was one of the men who collaborated to write European and Japanese Gardens (1902).

Notes

Selected publication

External links
 
 
 A. D. F. Hamlin architectural drawings and papers, circa 1835–1926. Held by the Department of Drawings & Archives, Avery Architectural & Fine Arts Library, Columbia University.

1855 births
1926 deaths
American architecture writers
American male non-fiction writers
American people of English descent
Architects from New York City
American expatriates in the Ottoman Empire
Amherst College alumni
Columbia University faculty